Coahoma is a town in Howard County, Texas, United States. The population was 817 at the 2010 census, down from 932 at the 2000 census.

Geography

Coahoma is located in eastern Howard County at  (32.296443, –101.304738). Interstate 20 runs through the southern part of the city, with access from Exit 188. I-20 leads west  to Big Springs, the county seat, and east  to Colorado City.

Demographics

2020 census

As of the 2020 United States census, there were 945 people, 332 households, and 223 families residing in the town.

2000 census
As of the census of 2000,  932 people, 354 households, and 261 families resided in the town. The population density was 774.9 people per square mile (299.9/km2). The 388 housing units averaged 322.6 per square mile (124.8/km2). The racial makeup of the town was 90.77% White, 0.54% African American, 0.32% Native American, 0.11% Asian, 6.97% from other races, and 1.29% from two or more races. Hispanics or Latinos of any race were 23.82% of the population.

Of the 354 households, 37.9% had children under the age of 18 living with them, 58.2% were married couples living together, 11.6% had a female householder with no husband present, and 26.0% were not families; 24.6% of all households were made up of individuals, and 15.3% had someone living alone who was 65 years of age or older. The average household size was 2.63 and the average family size was 3.13.

In the town, the population was distributed as 29.9% under the age of 18, 7.4% from 18 to 24, 26.3% from 25 to 44, 21.6% from 45 to 64, and 14.8% who were 65 years of age or older. The median age was 37 years. For every 100 females, there were 94.6 males. For every 100 females age 18 and over, there were 87.6 males.

The median income for a household in the town was $35,962, and for a family was $41,094. Males had a median income of $30,625 versus $19,167 for females. The per capita income for the town was $14,013. About 7.7% of families and 8.9% of the population were below the poverty line, including 8.7% of those under age 18 and 7.8% of those age 65 or over.

Education
The town is served by the Coahoma Independent School District.

References

External links
 Coahoma Independent School District

Towns in Howard County, Texas
Towns in Texas